Minneapolis is a city in the state of Minnesota and the county seat of Hennepin County.  As of the 2020 census the population was 429,954, making it the largest city in Minnesota and the  46th-most-populous in the United States.  Nicknamed the "City of Lakes", Minneapolis is abundant in water, with thirteen lakes, wetlands, the Mississippi River, creeks, and waterfalls. Minneapolis has its origins as the 19th century lumber milling and the flour milling capital of the world, and, to the present day, preserved its financial clout. It occupies both banks of the Mississippi River and adjoins Saint Paul, the state capital of Minnesota.

Before European settlement, the site of Minneapolis was inhabited by Dakota people. The settlement was founded along Saint Anthony Falls on a section of land north of Fort Snelling; its growth is attributed to its proximity to the fort and the falls providing power for industrial activity. Minneapolis, Saint Paul, and the surrounding area are collectively known as the Twin Cities, a metropolitan area home to 3.69 million inhabitants.

Minneapolis has one of the most extensive public park systems in the U.S.; many of these parks are connected by the Grand Rounds National Scenic Byway. Biking and walking trails run through many parts of the city including the Mississippi National River and Recreation Area, Boom Island Park, Lake of the Isles, Bde Maka Ska, and Lake Harriet, and Minnehaha Falls. Minneapolis has cold, snowy winters and warm, humid summers. Minneapolis is the birthplace of General Mills, the Pillsbury brand, and the Target Corporation. The city's cultural offerings include the Minneapolis Institute of Arts, the First Avenue nightclub, and four professional sports teams.

Minneapolis is home to University of Minnesota's main campus. The city's public transport is provided by Metro Transit and the international airport, serving the Twin Cities region, is located towards the south on the city limits.

The metropolis's location without competing neighbors, and the city's reputation for high quality of life notwithstanding, the striking disparities among the city's population may be the most significant issue facing 21st century Minneapolis. Minneapolis has a mayor-council government system. The Minnesota Democratic–Farmer–Labor Party (DFL) holds a majority of the council seats and Jacob Frey has been mayor since 2018.

History

Dakota natives, city founded 
Before European settlement, the Dakota Sioux were the sole occupants of the site of modern-day Minneapolis. In the Dakota language, the city's name is Bde Óta Othúŋwe ('Many Lakes Town'). The French explored the region in 1680. Gradually, more European-American settlers arrived, competing with the Dakota for game and other natural resources. Ending the Revolutionary War, the 1783 Treaty of Paris gave British-claimed territory east of the Mississippi River to the United States. In 1803, the U.S. acquired land to the west of the Mississippi from France in the Louisiana Purchase. In 1819, the U.S. Army built Fort Snelling at the southern edge of present-day Minneapolis to direct Native American trade away from British-Canadian traders, and to deter warring between the Dakota and Ojibwe in northern Minnesota. The fort attracted traders, settlers and merchants, spurring growth in the surrounding region. At the fort, agents of the St. Peters Indian Agency enforced the U.S. policy of assimilating Native Americans into European-American society, encouraging them to give up subsistence hunting and cultivate the land. Missionaries encouraged Native Americans to convert from their religion to Christianity.

The U.S. government pressed the Dakota to sell their land, which they ceded in a series of treaties that were negotiated by corrupt officials. In the decades following the signings of these treaties, their terms were rarely honored. During the American Civil War, officials plundered annuities promised to Native Americans, leading to famine among the Dakota. In 1862, a faction of the Dakota who were facing starvation declared war and killed settlers. The Dakota were interned and exiled from Minnesota. While the Dakota were being expelled, Franklin Steele laid claim to the east bank of Saint Anthony Falls, and John H. Stevens built a home on the west bank. Residents had divergent ideas on names for their community. In 1852, Charles Hoag proposed combining the Dakota word for 'water' (mni) with the Greek word for 'city', yielding Minneapolis. In 1851 after a meeting of the Minnesota Territorial Legislature, leaders of St. Anthony lost their bid to move the capital from Saint Paul. In a close vote, Saint Paul and Stillwater agreed to divide the federal funding between them: Saint Paul would be the capital, while Stillwater would build the prison. The St. Anthony contingent eventually won the state university.  In 1856, the territorial legislature authorized Minneapolis as a town on the Mississippi's west bank. Minneapolis was incorporated as a city in 1867 and in 1872, it merged with the city of St. Anthony on the river's east bank.

Lumber, waterpower, and flour milling 

Minneapolis's two founding industries—lumber and flour milling—developed in the 19th century concurrently. Flour milling overshadowed lumber by some decades; nevertheless, both came to prominence for about fifty years, and the magnitude of both industries extended beyond state borders—in the end, to the nation and the globe. A lumber industry was built around forests in northern Minnesota, largely by lumbermen emigrating from Maine's depleting forests. The city's first commercial sawmill was built in 1848, and the first gristmill in 1849. Towns built in western Minnesota with Minneapolis lumber shipped their wheat back to the city for milling.

The region's waterways were used to transport logs well after railroads developed; the Mississippi River carried logs to St. Louis until the early 20th century. In 1871, of the thirteen mills sawing lumber in St. Anthony, eight ran on water power and five ran on steam turbines. Minneapolis supplied the materials for farmsteads and settlement of rapidly expanding cities on the prairies that lacked wood. White pine milled in the city built Miles City, Montana; Bismarck, North Dakota; Sioux Falls, South Dakota; Omaha, Nebraska; and Wichita, Kansas.

Minneapolis developed around Saint Anthony Falls, the highest waterfall on the Mississippi, which was used as a source of energy. By 1871, the river's west bank had businesses including flour mills, woolen mills, iron works, a railroad machine shop, and mills for cotton, paper, sashes and wood-planing. Due to the occupational hazards of milling, by the 1890s, six companies manufactured artificial limbs. Grain grown in the Great Plains was shipped by rail to the city's34 flour mills. A 1989 Minnesota Archaeological Society analysis of the Minneapolis riverfront describes the use of water power in Minneapolis between 1880 and 1930 as "the greatest direct-drive waterpower center the world has ever seen". Minneapolis was given the nickname "Mill City."

An 1867 court case allowed digging the Eastman tunnel under the river at Nicollet Island. In 1869, a leak soon sucked the  tailrace into a -wide chasm. Community-led repairs failed and in 1870, several buildings and mills fell into the river. For years, the U.S. Army Corps of Engineers struggled to close the gap with timber until their concrete dike held in 1876.

The entrepreneurial founder of the company that became General Mills, Cadwallader C. Washburn adopted three technological innovations that added efficiency, speed, and safety to flour milling. Simple grist mills were revolutionized into modern machinery: middlings purifiers blew out the husks that had colored white flour, gradual reduction by steel and porcelain roller mills combined gluten with starch, and the Berhns Millstone Exhaust System decreased the risk of explosion by reducing the amount of flour dust in the air. William Dixon Gray developed some ideas and William de la Barre acquired others through industrial espionage in Hungary. Charles Alfred Pillsbury and the C. A. Pillsbury Company across the river hired Washburn employees and soon began using the new methods. The hard, red, spring wheat grown in Minnesota became valuable ($0.50 profit per barrel in 1871 increased to $4.50 in 1874), and Minnesota "patent" flour was recognized at the time as the best in the world. Later consumers discovered value in the bran that " ... Minneapolis flour millers routinely dumped" into the Mississippi. A single mill at Washburn-Crosby could make enough flour for 12 million loaves of bread each day and by 1900, fourteen percent of America's grain was milled in Minneapolis. By 1895, through the efforts of silent partner William Hood Dunwoody, Washburn-Crosby exported four million barrels of flour a year to the United Kingdom. When exports reached their peak in 1900, about one third of all flour milled in Minneapolis was shipped overseas.

Social tensions 

In 1886, when Martha Ripley founded Maternity Hospital for both married and unmarried mothers, Minneapolis made changes to rectify discrimination against unmarried women. Known initially as a kindly physician, mayor Doc Ames made his brother police chief, ran the city into corruption, and tried to leave town in 1902. Lincoln Steffens published Ames's story in "The Shame of Minneapolis" in 1903. Minneapolis has a long history of structural racism and has large racial disparities in housing, income, health care, and education. Some historians and commentators have said White Minneapolitans used discrimination based on race against the city's non-White residents. As White settlers displaced the indigenous population during the 19th century, they claimed the city's land, and Kirsten Delegard of Mapping Prejudice explains that today's disparities evolved from control of the land. Discrimination increased when flour milling moved to the east coast and the economy declined.

During the early 20th century, bigotry was presented in several ways. With a Black population of less than one percent, in Delegard's words, the city was "not a particularly segregated place" before 1910, when a developer wrote the first restrictive covenant based on race and ethnicity into a Minneapolis deed. But then realtors adopted the practice, thousands of times preventing non-Whites from owning or leasing properties, and they continued for four decades until the city became more and more racially divided. Though such language was prohibited by state law in 1953 and by the federal Fair Housing Act of 1968, restrictive covenants against minorities remained in many Minneapolis deeds as recently as 2021, when the city gave residents a means to remove them. The Ku Klux Klan entered family life but was only effectively a force in the city from 1921 until 1923. The gangster Kid Cann engaged in bribery and intimidation between the 1920s and the 1940s. After Minnesota passed a eugenics law in 1925, the proprietors of Eitel Hospital sterilized people at Faribault State Hospital. From the end of World War I in 1918 until 1950, antisemitism was commonplace in Minneapolis—Carey McWilliams called the city the anti-Semitic capital of the United States. A hate group called the Silver Legion of America held meetings in the city from 1936 to 1938. In 1948, Mount Sinai Hospital opened as the city's first hospital to employ members of minority races and religions.

During the financial downturn of the Great Depression, the violent Teamsters Strike of 1934 led to laws acknowledging workers' rights. Mayor Hubert Humphrey helped the city establish fair employment practices, and, in 1946, a human-relations council that interceded on behalf of minorities. In 1966 and 1967, years of significant turmoil across the US, suppressed anger among the Black population was released in two disturbances on Plymouth Avenue. A coalition reached a peaceful outcome but failed to solve Black poverty and unemployment; Charles Stenvig, a law-and-order candidate, became mayor. Minneapolis contended with White supremacy, and engaged with the civil rights movement. In 1968, the American Indian Movement was founded in Minneapolis. Between 1958 and 1963, as part of urban renewal in America, Minneapolis demolished roughly 40 percent of downtown, including the Gateway District and its significant architecture, such as the Metropolitan Building. Efforts to save the building failed but encouraged interest in historic preservation.

On May 25, 2020, a then-17-year-old witness recorded the murder of George Floyd; her video contradicted the police department's initial statement. Floyd, an African-American man, suffocated when Derek Chauvin, a White Minneapolis police officer, knelt on his neck and back for more than nine minutes. While Floyd was neither the first nor the last Black man killed by Minneapolis police, his murder sparked international rebellions and mass protests. The local insurgency resulted in extraordinary levels of property damage in Minneapolis; destruction included a police station that demonstrators overran and set on fire. The Twin Cities experienced ongoing unrest over racial injustice from 2020 to 2022.

Geography

The history and economic growth of Minneapolis are linked to water, the city's defining physical characteristic. Long periods of glaciation and interglacial melt carved several riverbeds through what is now Minneapolis. During the last glacial period, around 10,000 years ago, ice buried in these ancient river channels melted, resulting in basins that filled with water to become the lakes of Minneapolis. Meltwater from Lake Agassiz fed the glacial River Warren, which created a large waterfall that eroded upriver past the confluence of the Mississippi River, where it left a  drop in the Mississippi. This site is located in what is now downtown Saint Paul. Minnehaha Falls also developed during this period via similar processes.

Minneapolis is sited above an artesian aquifer and on flat terrain. Water supply is managed by four watershed districts that correspond with the Mississippi and the city's three creeks. The city has thirteen lakes, three large ponds, and five unnamed wetlands.

Neighborhoods 

Minneapolis has 83 neighborhoods and 70 neighborhood organizations. In some cases, two or more neighborhoods act together under one organization.

In 2018, Minneapolis City Council voted to approve the Minneapolis 2040 Comprehensive Plan, which resulted in a city-wide end to single-family zoning. Slate reported that Minneapolis was believed to be the first major city in the U.S. to make citywide such a revision in housing possibilities. At the time, 70 percent of residential land was zoned for detached, single-family homes, though many of those areas had "nonconforming" buildings with more housing units. City leaders sought to increase the supply of housing so more neighborhoods would be affordable and to decrease the effects single-family zoning had caused on racial disparities and segregation. The Brookings Institution called it "a relatively rare example of success for the YIMBY agenda". A Hennepin County District Court judge blocked the city from enforcing the plan because it lacked an overall environmental review. Arguing it will evaluate projects on an individual basis, as of July 2022, the city is allowed to use the plan while an appeal is pending.

Climate
Minneapolis experiences a hot-summer humid continental climate (Dfa in the Köppen climate classification), that is typical of southern parts of the Upper Midwest, and is situated in USDA plant hardiness zone 4b; although small enclaves of the city are classified as zone 5a. Minneapolis has cold, snowy winters and hot, humid summers, as is typical in a continental climate.

According to the NOAA, the annual average for sunshine duration is 58 percent. Minneapolis experiences a full range of precipitation and related weather events, including snow, sleet, ice, rain, thunderstorms, and fog. The snowiest winter on record was 1983–84, when  of snow fell. The least-snowiest winter was 1890–91, when  fell.

Demographics 

Dakota tribes, mostly the Mdewakanton, permanently occupied the area of present-day Minneapolis near their sacred site, St. Anthony Falls.

During the 1850s and 1860s, European and Euro-American settlers from New England, New York, Bohemia and Canada moved to the Minneapolis area. During the mid-1860s, immigrants came from Finland, Sweden, Norway and Denmark, as did migrant workers from Mexico and Latin America. Other migrants came from Germany, Poland, Italy, and Greece. Central European migrants settled in the Northeast neighborhood, which is still known for its Polish cultural heritage. Jews from Central and Eastern Europe, and Russia began arriving in the 1880s and settled primarily on the north side before moving to western suburbs in the 1950s and 1960s.

The population of Minneapolis grew until 1950 when the census peaked at 521,718—the only time it has exceeded a half million. The population then declined for decades; after World War II, people moved to the suburbs, and generally out of the Midwest.

For a short period of the 1940s, Japanese and Japanese Americans lived in Minneapolis due to US-government relocations, and during the 1950s, the US government relocated Native Americans to cities like Minneapolis, attempting to do away with Indian reservations.

Chinese, Japanese, Filipinos, Hmong, Lao, Cambodians, and Vietnamese arrived in the 1970s and 1980s, and people from Tibet, Burma, and Thailand came in the 1990s and 2000s. The population of people from India doubled by 2010.

After the Rust Belt economy declined during the early 1980s, Minnesota's Black population, a large fraction of whom arrived from cities such as Chicago and Gary, Indiana, nearly tripled in less than twenty years.  Black migrants were drawn to Minneapolis and the Greater Twin Cities by its abundance of jobs, good schools, and relatively safe neighborhoods. Beginning in the 1990s, a sizable Latin American population arrived, along with immigrants from the Horn of Africa, especially Somalia; however, Somali immigration slowed considerably after a 2017 executive order from President Donald Trump. As of 2019, more than 20,000 Somalis live in Minneapolis. As of 2020, African Americans make up about one fifth of the city's population. A Black family in Minneapolis earns less than half as much per year as a White family. Black people own their homes at one-third the rate of White families. Specifically, the median income for a Black family was $36,000 in 2018, about $47,000 less than for a white family. Black Minneapolitans thus earn about 44 percent per year compared to White Minneapolitans, one of the country's largest income gaps.

In 2020 based on Gallup data, UCLA's Williams Institute reported the Twin Cities had an estimated LGBT adult population of 4.2%, the 18th-highest number of LGBT residents of the 50 largest metropolitan areas in the US, and did not rank by percent. Human Rights Campaign gave Minneapolis its highest-possible score in 2022.

2020 census and 2021 estimates 
According to the 2020 U.S. census, the population of Minneapolis was 429,954. Hispanic or Latino comprised 44,513 (10.4%). Among those not Hispanic or Latino, 249,581 (58.0%) were White alone (62.7% White alone or in combination), 81,088 (18.9%) were Black or African American alone (21.3% Black alone or in combination), 24,929 (5.8%) were Asian alone, 7,433 (1.2%) were American Indian and Alaska Native alone, 25,387 (0.6%) some other race alone, and 34,463 (5.2%) were multiracial.

According to the 2021 ACS, the most common ancestries were German (22.9%), Irish (10.8%), Norwegian (8.9%), Subsaharan African (6.7%), and Swedish (6.1%). U.S. veterans made up 3.2% of the population. Among those five years and older, 81.2% spoke only English at home, while 7.1% spoke Spanish and 11.7% spoke other languages, including large numbers of Somali and Hmong speakers. Those born abroad made up 13.7% of the population, 53.2% of whom are naturalized U.S. citizens. The most common regions from which immigrants arrived were Africa (40.6%), Asia (24.6%), and Latin America (25.2%). Foreign born residents who arrived in 2010 or earlier were 34.6% of those.

The 2021 ACS found the median household income in Minneapolis was $69,397. For families it was $97,670, married couples $123,693, and non-family households $54,083. The census found that 15.0% lived in poverty. Residents who had obtained a bachelor's degree or higher made up 53.6% of the population, and 92.1% had at least a high school degree. The median gross rent in Minneapolis was $1,225. The homeownership rate was 49.8%, much lower than the overall state rate (73.0%). The survey found that 92.7% of housing units in Minneapolis were occupied, and 43.7% of housing units in the city were built in 1939 or earlier.

Religion 

The indigenous Dakota people believed in the Great Spirit, and were surprised that not all European settlers were religious. More than 50 denominations and religions are present in Minneapolis; a majority of the city's population are Christian. Settlers who arrived from New England were for the most part Protestants, Quakers, and Universalists. The oldest continuously used church, Our Lady of Lourdes Catholic Church, was built in 1856 by Universalists and soon afterward was acquired by a French Catholic congregation. The first Jewish congregation was formed in 1878 as Shaarai Tov, and built Temple Israel in 1928. St. Mary's Orthodox Cathedral was founded in 1887; it opened a missionary school and created the first Russian Orthodox seminary in the U.S. Edwin Hawley Hewitt designed St. Mark's Episcopal Cathedral and Hennepin Avenue United Methodist Church, both of which are located south of downtown. The Basilica of Saint Mary, the first basilica in the U.S. and co-cathedral of the Roman Catholic Archdiocese of Saint Paul and Minneapolis, was named by Pope Pius XI in 1926.

By 1959, the Temple of Islam was located in north Minneapolis, and the Islamic Center of Minnesota was established in 1965.  Somalis who live in Minneapolis are primarily Sunni Muslim. Minneapolis became the first major American city to publicly broadcast the Muslim call to prayer after March 2022, when the city council approved a resolution to allow it.  In 1971, a reported 150 persons attended classes at a Hindu temple near the university.  In 1972, a relief agency resettled the first Shi'a Muslim family from Uganda in the Twin Cities. The city has about seven Buddhist centers and meditation centers.

The Billy Graham Evangelistic Association was headquartered in Minneapolis from about 1950 until 2001. Christ Church Lutheran in the Longfellow neighborhood was the final work in the career of Eliel Saarinen, and has an education building designed by his son Eero.

Economy 

As of 2020, the Minneapolis–Saint Paul area was the second-largest economic center in the American Midwest behind Chicago. Early in the city's history, millers were required to pay for wheat with cash during the growing season, and then to store the wheat until it was needed for flour. This required the large amounts of capital that lumbering had accumulated, which stimulated the local banking industry and made Minneapolis a major financial center. Minneapolis area employment is primarily in trade, transportation, utilities, education, health services, and professional and business services. Smaller numbers of residents are employed in manufacturing; leisure and hospitality; mining; logging, and construction.

In 2022, the Twin Cities metropolitan area tied with Boston as the eighth-highest concentration of major corporate headquarters in the U.S., and five Fortune 500 corporations were headquartered within the city limits of Minneapolis. They are Target Corporation, U.S. Bancorp, Ameriprise Financial, Xcel Energy, and Thrivent. Other companies with offices in Minneapolis include Accenture, Bellisio Foods, Canadian Pacific, Coloplast, RBC and Voya Financial.

The Minneapolis Grain Exchange, which was founded in 1881, is located near the riverfront and is the only exchange for hard, red, spring wheat futures and options. The Federal Reserve Bank of Minneapolis serves Minnesota, Montana, North and South Dakota, and parts of Wisconsin and Michigan; it has the smallest population of the 12 districts in the Federal Reserve System. Among the district's responsibilities are to supervise and examine member banks, examine financial institutions, lend to depository institutions, distribute currency and coin, clear checks, operate Fedwire, and serve as a bank for the US Treasury.

Arts and culture

Visual arts

Walker Art Center is located at the summit of Lowry Hill near downtown. The center's size doubled in 2005 with an addition by Herzog & de Meuron, and expanded with a  park that was designed by Michel Desvigne and is located across the street from the Minneapolis Sculpture Garden.

Minneapolis Institute of Art, which is known as  since its 100th anniversary and is located in south-central Minneapolis, was designed by McKim, Mead & White in 1915;  is the largest art museum in the city and has 100,000 pieces in its permanent collection. New wings, which were designed by Kenzo Tange and Michael Graves, opened in 1974 and 2006, respectively; the new wings house contemporary and modern works, and provide additional gallery space.

Frank Gehry designed Weisman Art Museum, which opened in 1993, for the University of Minnesota. A 2011 addition by Gehry doubled the size of the galleries. The Museum of Russian Art opened in a restored church in 2005, and hosts a collection of 20th-century Russian art and special events. Northeast Minneapolis Arts District hosts 400 independent artists, a center at the Northrup-King Building, and recurring annual events.

Theater and performing arts 

Minneapolis has hosted theatrical performances since the end of the American Civil War. Early theaters included Pence Opera House, the Academy of Music, Grand Opera House, Lyceum, and later Metropolitan Opera House, which opened in 1894. , Minneapolis has numerous theater companies.

Guthrie Theater, the area's largest theater company, occupies a three-stage complex that was designed by French architect Jean Nouvel and overlooks the Mississippi River. The company was founded in 1963 by Sir  Tyrone Guthrie as a prototype alternative to Broadway. Minneapolis purchased and renovated the Orpheum, State, and Pantages Theatres, vaudeville and film houses on Hennepin Avenue that are now used for concerts and plays. Another renovated theater, the Shubert, joined with the Hennepin Center for the Arts to become the Cowles Center for Dance and the Performing Arts, which represents more than 20 performing arts groups.

Music 

Minnesota Orchestra plays classical and popular music at Orchestra Hall under Thomas Søndergård, the music director effective with the 2023–2024 season. The orchestra won a 2014 Grammy for their recording of Symphonies Nos. 1 & 4 by Sibelius, and a 2004 Grammy for composer Dominick Argento with their recording of Casa Guidi.

Singer and multi-instrumentalist Prince was born in Minneapolis and lived in the area most of his life. Prince was a musical prodigy, enriched by a music program at The Way Community Center. With fellow local musicians, many of whom recorded at Twin/Tone Records, Prince helped change First Avenue and the 7th Street Entry  into prominent venues for artists and audiences.

The city hosts several other concert venues, including Icehouse, the Cedar, the Dakota, and the Cabooze. Live Nation books The Armory, the Fillmore and the Varsity Theater.

Hüsker Dü and The Replacements were pivotal in the U.S. alternative rock boom during the 1980s. Underground Minnesota hip hop acts such as Atmosphere feature the city and Minnesota in their song lyrics. Minneapolis's opera companies are Minnesota Opera, Mill City Summer Opera, the Gilbert & Sullivan Very Light Opera Company, and Really Spicy Opera.

Historical museums
Exhibits at Mill City Museum feature the city's history of flour milling, and Minnehaha Depot was built in 1875. The American Swedish Institute occupies a former mansion on Park Avenue. The American Indian Cultural Corridor, about eight blocks on Franklin Avenue, houses All My Relatives Gallery. On Penn Avenue North is the Minnesota African American Heritage Museum and Gallery which was founded in 2018. In a former mansion one block from Mia is Hennepin History Museum. On East Lake Street is the world's only Somali history museum, the tiny Somali Museum of Minnesota. The Bakken, which was formerly known as Museum of Electricity in Life, shifted focus in 2016 from electricity and magnetism to invention and innovation, and in 2020 opened a new entrance on Bde Maka Ska.

Charity 
Philanthropy and charitable giving have been part of the Minneapolis community since the 1800s. , Alight helps 2.5 million refugees and displaced persons each year in developing countries in Africa and Asia. Catholic Charities of Minneapolis and Saint Paul is one of the largest non-profit organizations in the state, and a provider of several social services. The Minneapolis Foundation invests and administers over 1,000 charitable funds. According to AmeriCorps, in 2017, Minneapolis–Saint Paul, with 46.3 percent of the population volunteering, had the highest proportion of volunteers among U.S. cities.

Literary arts
The nonprofit literary presses Coffee House Press, Milkweed Editions, and Graywolf Press are based in Minneapolis. The University of Minnesota Press publishes books, journals, and the Minnesota Multiphasic Personality Inventory. Open Book, Minnesota Center for Book Arts, and The Loft Literary Center are located in Minneapolis.

Cuisine 

West Broadway Avenue was a cultural center during the early 20th century but by the 1950s, flight to the suburbs began and streetcar service ended citywide.
One of the largest urban food deserts in the U.S. is on the north side of Minneapolis, where as of mid-2017, 70,000 people had access to only two grocery stores. When Aldi closed in 2023, the area again became a food desert with two full-service grocers. The nonprofit Appetite for Change sought to improve the diet of residents, competing against an influx of fast-food stores, and by 2017 it administered ten gardens, sold produce in the mid-year months at West Broadway Farmers Market, supplied its restaurants, and gave away boxes of fresh produce.

Minneapolis-based individuals who have won the food industry James Beard Foundation Award include chef Gavin Kaysen, writer Dara Moskowitz Grumdahl, television personality Andrew Zimmern, and chef Sean Sherman, whose restaurant Owamni received James Beard's 2022 best new restaurant award. Kaysen and others on Team USA won a silver medal in the 2015 Bocuse d'Or.

Both purported originators of the Jucy Lucy burger—the 5-8 Club and Matt's Bar—have served it since the 1950s. The Herbivorous Butcher opened in 2016; the shop offers natural alternatives to meat that were described by CBS News as "meat-free meat" from the "first vegan 'butcher' shop in the United States". East African cuisine arrived in Minneapolis with the wave of migrants from Somalia that started in the 1990s.

Annual events 

Each January and February, a series of events called The Great Northern is held in Minneapolis. The series includes the U.S. Pond Hockey Championships; the City of Lakes Loppet, a  cross-country ski race; and the Saint Paul Winter Carnival. The annual MayDay Parade is held on Bloomington Avenue. Other events include Art-A-Whirl; Pride Festival & Parade, Stone Arch Bridge Festival, and Twin Cities Juneteenth Celebration in June; Minneapolis Aquatennial in July; Minnesota Fringe Festival, Loring Park Art Festival, Metris Uptown Art Fair, Powderhorn Festival of Arts and the Lake Hiawatha Neighborhood Festival in August; Minneapolis Monarch Festival in September that celebrates the Monarch butterfly's  migration;  and the Twin Cities Marathon in October.

Libraries
The Minneapolis Public Library, founded by T. B. Walker in 1885, merged with the Hennepin County Library system in 2008. Fifteen branches of the Hennepin County Library serve Minneapolis. The downtown Central Library, designed by César Pelli, opened in 2006. Seven special collections hold resources for researchers.

Sports 

Minneapolis has four professional sports teams. The American football team Minnesota Vikings and the baseball team Minnesota Twins have played in the state since 1961. The Vikings were an National Football League (NFL) expansion team and the Twins were formed when the Washington Senators relocated to Minnesota. The Twins won the World Series in 1987 and 1991, and have played at Target Field since 2010. The Vikings played in the Super Bowl following the 1969, 1973, 1974, and 1976 seasons, losing all four games. The basketball team Minnesota Timberwolves returned National Basketball Association (NBA) basketball to Minneapolis in 1989, and were followed by Minnesota Lynx in 1999. Both basketball teams play in the Target Center.

In the 2010s, the Lynx were the most-successful sports team in the city and a dominant force in the Women's National Basketball Association (WNBA), winning four WNBA championships from 2011 to 2017. In 2016, following the killings of Philando Castile and Alton Sterling, Lynx captains wore black shirts as a protest by Black athletes for social change.

In addition to professional sports teams, Minneapolis also hosts a majority of the Minnesota Golden Gophers' college sports teams of the University of Minnesota. The Gophers football team plays at Huntington Bank Stadium and have won seven national championships. The Gophers women's ice hockey team is a six-time NCAA champion. The Gophers men's ice hockey team plays at 3M Arena at Mariucci, and won five  NCAA national championships. Both the Golden Gophers men's basketball and women's basketball teams play at Williams Arena.

The  U.S. Bank Stadium was built for the Vikings at a cost of $1.122 billion, $348million of which was provided by the state of Minnesota and $150million came from the city of Minneapolis. The stadium, which was called "Minnesota's biggest-ever public works project", opened in 2016 with 66,000 seats, which was expanded to 70,000 for the 2018 Super Bowl.  U.S. Bank Stadium also hosts indoor running and rollerblading nights, concerts, and other events.

The city hosts some major sporting events, including baseball All-Star Games, World Series, Super Bowls, NCAA Division 1 men's and women's basketball Final Four, the AMA Motocross Championship, the X Games, and the WNBA All-Star Game.

Minnesota Wild, an National Hockey League team, play at the Xcel Energy Center; and the Major League Soccer soccer team Minnesota United FC play at Allianz Field, both of which are located in Saint Paul. Six golf courses are located within the Minneapolis city limits. While living in Minneapolis, Scott and Brennan Olson founded and later sold Rollerblade, the company that popularized the sport of inline skating.

The Twin Cities Marathon is a Boston Marathon qualifier.

Parks and recreation

In his book The American City: What Works, What Doesn't, Alexander Garvin wrote Minneapolis built "the best-located, best-financed, best-designed, and best-maintained public open space in America".

Minnehaha Falls, within Minnehaha Park; established in 1889, it was one of the first state parks in the United States.]]
The city's parks are governed and operated by the Minneapolis Park and Recreation Board, an independent park district. Foresight, donations, and effort by community leaders enabled Horace Cleveland to create his finest landscape architecture, preserving geographical landmarks and linking them with boulevards and parkways. The city's Chain of Lakes, consisting of seven lakes and Minnehaha Creek, is connected by bicycle paths, and running and walking paths, and are used for swimming, fishing, picnics, boating, and ice skating. A parkway for cars, a bikeway for riders, and a walkway for pedestrians run parallel along the  route of the Grand Rounds National Scenic Byway. Theodore Wirth is credited with developing the parks system. Approximately 15 percent of land in Minneapolis is parks, in accordance with the 2020 national median, and 98 percent of residents live within  of a park.

Parks are interlinked in many places, and the Mississippi National River and Recreation Area connects regional parks and visitor centers. The , hiking-only Winchell Trail runs along the Mississippi River, and offers views of and access to the Mississippi Gorge and a rustic hiking experience.

Minnehaha Park contains the 53-foot (16 m) waterfall Minnehaha Falls. The regional park received over 2,050,000 visitors in 2017. In the bestselling and often-parodied 19th-century epic poem The Song of Hiawatha, Henry Wadsworth Longfellow named Hiawatha's wife Minnehaha for the Minneapolis waterfall.

Minneapolis's climate provides opportunities for winter activities such as ice fishing, snowshoeing, ice skating, cross-country skiing, and sledding at many parks and lakes between December and March. The City of Lakes Loppet cross-country ski race is part of the American ski marathon series. The park board maintains 20 outdoor ice rinks in winter and the city's Lake Nokomis is host to the annual U.S. Pond Hockey Championships.

Government 

Minneapolis is a majority holding for the Minnesota Democratic–Farmer–Labor Party (DFL), an affiliate of the Democratic Party, and had its last Republican mayor in 1973. The city adopted instant-runoff voting in 2006, first using it in the 2009 elections. DFL council member Jacob Frey was elected mayor of Minneapolis in 2017, and was re-elected in 2021. The Park and Recreation Board is an independent city department with nine elected commissioners. The board levies its own taxes subject to city charter limits. Also an independent department, the Board of Estimation and Taxation oversees city levies.

Representing the city's13 wards, the Minneapolis City Council is progressive with 12 DFL council members and one from the Democratic Socialists of America. Andrea Jenkins was unanimously chosen as president of the city council in 2022. In 2022, the council has seven political newcomers and for the first time had a majority of non-White council members.

The city council approves the mayor's budget making amendments as needed. The city's primary source of funding is a property tax. As of 2023, sales (and local use tax for out-of-state purchases) charged within the city totals 8.03 percent, a combination of state, county, special district, and a city sales tax of 0.50percent.

In 2021, a ballot question shifted more power from the city council to the mayor, a change that proponents had tried to achieve since the early 20th century. The restructured mayor's role created a new Minneapolis Office of Community Safety, with its commissioner overseeing the police and fire departments, 911 dispatch, emergency management, and violence prevention. The city in 2021 proposed a new cooperation with the police department and a mental health services company, Canopy Mental Health & Consulting, to respond to some 911 calls that do not require police. The organization had responded to more than three thousand 911 calls as of September 2022 and was proposed to continue through the 2023–2024 budget year.

In 2021, the U.S. Justice Department began to investigate the city's policing practices, and in 2022, the Minnesota Department of Human Rights completed its two-year investigation of the police department that found a "pattern or practice of race discrimination in violation of the Minnesota Human Rights Act", The 2023 city budget planned for one negotiated consent decree, and the statutory minimum of 731 officers in the police department which was about 260 officers short.

After the murder of George Floyd in  May 2020, about 166 police officers left of their own accord either to retirement or to temporary leave—many with PTSD—and a crime wave resulted in more than 500 shootings. A Reuters investigation found that killings surged when a "hands-off" attitude resulted in fewer officer-initiated encounters. As of July 2022, violent crime rose three percent across Minneapolis compared with 2021, and in 2020, it rose 21 percent.

Violent crime was down for 2022 in every category except assaults. Carjackings, gunshots fired, gunshot wounds, and robberies decreased, and homicides were down 20 percent compared to the previous year.

In 2015, the city council passed a resolution making fossil fuel divestment city policy, joining 17 cities worldwide in the Carbon Neutral Cities Alliance. Minneapolis' climate plan calls for an 80 percent reduction in greenhouse gas emissions by 2050. Minneapolis has a separation ordinance that directs local law-enforcement officers not to "take any law enforcement action" for the sole purpose of finding undocumented immigrants, nor to ask an individual about his or her immigration status.

At the federal level, Minneapolis is within Minnesota's 5th congressional district, which since 2018 has been represented by Democrat Ilhan Omar. Minnesota's U.S. Senators, Amy Klobuchar and Tina Smith, were elected or appointed while living in Minneapolis, and are also Democrats.

Education

Primary and secondary education
Minneapolis Public Schools serves 28,689 students as of October 2022, in more than fifty schools, divided between community and magnet. As of 2023, enrollment is declining about 1.5% per year, and approximately 60 percent of school age children attend district schools. Many students enrolled in alternatives such as charter schools, of which the city has thirty as of 2023. By state law, charter schools are open to all students and are tuition free. In 2022, about 1200 at-risk students attended district Contract Alternative Schools.

The public school district adopted a comprehensive district design beginning with the 2020–2021 school year to address academics, equity, financial sustainability, and to end disadvantages for students of color and students from low-income neighborhoods. The design changed student placement, changed the boundaries for almost all schools, moved magnet schools to central locations and narrowed the magnet types, standardized many start times to improve bus service, and gave every student a community elementary and middle school in their neighborhood. Students may attend a community school by request, and be accepted to the school in their neighborhood. Students enter a lottery to be enrolled in a magnet school. School district demographics differ from the city's. White students make up 41 percent, Black students 35 percent, Hispanic 14 percent, and 5 percent each are Asian and Native American. Students qualifying for free or reduced lunches number 48 percent, and English-language learners are about 17 percent, in a district that speaks 100 languages at home. About 15 percent are special education students. In 2020, the district's drop out rate decreased to 3.7 percent and its graduation rate was 74.24 percent.

Colleges and universities 

The main campus of the University of Minnesota is in Minneapolis; with more than 50,000 students, in 2023 it is the sixth largest campus in the US by enrollment. College rankings for 2023 place the school in a range of 44th to 185th (2021) for academics worldwide.  QS found a decline over a decade. Shanghai finds excellence in ecology, business management, library & information science, and biotechnology. The university has unusual autonomy—regents are in control, independent of city government—that has existed in Minnesota since 1851, when the provision was included in the constitution.

Augsburg University, Minneapolis College of Art and Design, and North Central University are private four-year colleges; the first two also offer master's programs. The public two-year Minneapolis Community and Technical College and the private Dunwoody College of Technology provide career training and associate degrees and the latter also offers a bachelor's program. Saint Mary's University of Minnesota has a Twin Cities campus for its graduate and professional programs. Opening a new Minneapolis site in 2023, Red Lake Nation College is a federally recognized tribal college site that teaches Ojibwe culture. The large, principally online universities Capella University and Walden University are both headquartered in the city. The public four-year Metropolitan State University and the private four-year University of St. Thomas are among post-secondary institutions based elsewhere that have campuses in Minneapolis.

The city has more than twenty-five licensed career schools that offer short term training, some diplomas and certificates in a wide variety of fields including business, yoga, pilates, portfolio development, CompTIA certification, floral design, cosmetology, construction, healthcare, information technology, and for those who wish to become a personal trainer, ophthalmic technician, or phlebotomy technician.

Media 

Several newspapers are published in Minneapolis; Star Tribune, Finance & Commerce, Minnesota Spokesman-Recorder, MinnPost, and the university's The Minnesota Daily. Two magazines are published in the city, Mpls. St. Paul and Twin Cities Business. Other publications include Minnesota Women's Press, North News, Northeaster, Insight News, The Circle, Southwest Voices, The Monitor, Longfellow Nokomis Messenger, the Southwest Connector, Streets.mn, Dispatch and Racket.

In 2023, Nielsen finds the Minneapolis–Saint Paul area to be the 15th largest designated market area, down from 14th in 2022. Nielsen has 39 radio station subscribers in the Twin Cities' market. The area has 1,742,530 TV homes. TV Guide lists 151 TV channels for Minneapolis.

Krista Tippett, winner of a Peabody Award and the National Humanities Medal, produces the On Being project from her Minneapolis studio.

Infrastructure

Transportation 

Minneapolis has two light rail lines, one commuter rail line, five bus rapid transit (BRT) lines, and about 90 bus lines with over 8,000 stops. As of 2021, riders of Metro Transit system-wide are 44 percent persons of color.

The Metro Blue Line light rail line connects the Mall of America and Minneapolis–Saint Paul International Airport in Bloomington to downtown, and the Metro Green Line travels east from downtown through the University of Minnesota campus to downtown Saint Paul. A  Green Line extension called the Southwest LRT will connect downtown Minneapolis with the southwestern suburbs St. Louis Park, Hopkins, Minnetonka and Eden Prairie. About a decade late, the Southwest line is expected to open in 2027, and has cost $1.8billion as of 2022. An extension of the Blue Line to the northwest suburbs re-entered the planning stages for a new route alignment in 2020. The  Northstar Commuter rail runs from Big Lake, Minnesota, to downtown Minneapolis.

The 2020 census found that the average commute to work for the Minneapolis population was 22 minutes. The most common means of transportation to work was driving alone (45.0%), carpooling (6.5%), public transit (5.6%), walking (4.8%), and bicycling (1.7%). However, the 2015 ACS put the percentage of workers commuting to work by bicycle in Minneapolis at 5%, one of the highest in the nation.

Hundreds of homeless people nightly sought shelter on Green Line trains until overnight service was cut back in 2019. In 2020, a rise in crime on the light rail system led to discussion in the state legislature on how to best address the problem.

BRT lines are 25 percent faster than regular bus lines because riders pay before boarding, stops are limited, and sometimes they employ signal prioritization. The newest BRT line, the D Line, runs along one of Minnesota's most used bus lines, the  route5, where a quarter of households don't have access to a car. Public transit ridership in the Twin Cities was 91.6 million in 2019, a three-percent decline over the previous year, which was part of a national trend in falling local bus ridership. Ridership on the Metro system remained steady or grew slightly.

About four percent of commuters cycle to work as of 2019. Off-street facilities include the Grand Rounds National Scenic Byway, Midtown Greenway, Little Earth Trail, Hiawatha LRT Trail, Kenilworth Trail, and Cedar Lake Trail. Seeking funding for 2023, bicycle-sharing provider Nice Ride Minnesota served 70,000 riders in 2021.

The bridge was rebuilt in 14 months.

The Minneapolis Skyway System,  of enclosed pedestrian bridges called skyways, links 80 city blocks downtown with access to second-floor restaurants, retailers, government, sports facilities, doctor's offices and other businesses that are open on weekdays.

Minneapolis–Saint Paul International Airport (MSP) is served by 18 international, domestic, charter, and regional carriers, and is the headquarters of Sun Country Airlines. As of 2019, MSP is also the second-largest hub for Delta Air Lines, which operates more flights out of MSP than any other airline.

Health care

Abbott Northwestern Hospital, Children's Minnesota, Hennepin Healthcare, M Health Fairview University of Minnesota Masonic Children's Hospital, M Health Fairview University of Minnesota Medical Center, M Health Fairview University of Minnesota Medical Center, Minneapolis VA Medical Center, and Phillips Eye Institute serve the city.

Cardiac surgery was developed at the university's Variety Club Heart Hospital, where by 1957, more than 200 patients—most of whom were children—had survived open-heart operations. Working with surgeon C. Walton Lillehei, Medtronic began to build portable and implantable cardiac pacemakers about this time.

Hennepin Healthcare, a public teaching hospital and Level I trauma center, opened in 1887 as City Hospital, and has also been known as Minneapolis General Hospital, Hennepin County General Hospital, and HCMC. In 2022, the Hennepin Healthcare safety net counted 626,000 in-person and 50,586 virtual clinic visits, and 87,731 emergency room visits.

The Mashkiki Waakaa'igan Pharmacy on Bloomington Avenue dispenses free prescription drugs and culturally sensitive care to members of any federally recognized tribes living in Hennepin and Ramsey counties, regardless of insurance status. The pharmacy is funded by the Fond du Lac Band of Lake Superior Chippewa.

Services and utilities 

Xcel Energy supplies electricity, CenterPoint Energy supplies gas, Lumen Technologies provides landline telephone service, and Comcast provides cable service.

Downtown Improvement District (DID) ambassadors, who are identified by their blue-and-green-yellow fluorescent jackets, daily patrol a 120-block area of downtown to greet and assist visitors, remove trash, monitor property, and call police when they are needed. The ambassador program is a public-private partnership that is paid for by a special downtown tax district.

Notable people

Sister cities
Minneapolis's sister cities are:

 Bosaso, Somalia (2014)
 Cuernavaca, Mexico (2008)
 Eldoret, Kenya (2000)
 Harbin, China (1992)
 Ibaraki, Japan (1980)
 Kuopio, Finland (1972)
 Najaf, Iraq (2009)
 Novosibirsk, Russia (1988)
 Santiago, Chile (1961)
 Tours, France (1991)
 Uppsala, Sweden (2000)
 Winnipeg, Canada (1973)

See also 

 List of events and attractions in Minneapolis
 List of tallest buildings in Minneapolis
 National Register of Historic Places listings in Hennepin County, Minnesota
 USS Minneapolis, 4 ships (including 2 as Minneapolis-Saint Paul)

Notes

References

Works cited
Books

 
 
 
 
 
 
 
 
 
 
 
 
 
 
 
 
 
 
 
 
 
 
 
 
 
 

Journal articles

Further reading

External links
 
 "Minneapolis Past" — documentary produced by Twin Cities Public Television.

 
Cities in Hennepin County, Minnesota
County seats in Minnesota
Minneapolis–Saint Paul
Minnesota populated places on the Mississippi River
Articles containing video clips
Populated places established in 1856
1856 establishments in Minnesota Territory
Cities in Minnesota